László Baán (born 18 July 1961 in Budapest) is a Hungarian economist and museum curator.

Baán has been Director General of the Museum of Fine Arts in Budapest since 2004 and since 2011 has also been director of a new national collection of buildings at the museum.

References

1961 births
Living people
Hungarian economists
People from Budapest
Directors of museums in Hungary